Lasuri is a village in Shahkot in Jalandhar district of Punjab State, India. The village is administered by a sarpanch who is an elected representative of village as per Panchayati raj (India).

.

Lasuri Local Language is Punjabi. Lasuri Village Total population is 1243 and number of houses are 240. Female Population is 50.6%. Village literacy rate is 71.1% and the Female Literacy rate is 33.3%.

Population

Transport 
Sindhar station is the nearest train station.

References 

Villages in Jalandhar district